The 2004 Campeonato Paulista de Futebol Profissional da Primeira Divisão - Série A1 was the 103rd season of São Paulo's top professional football league. The competition began on 18 January and ended on 21 April. São Caetano were the champions, winning for the first time in their history. Vágner Love was the top scorer with 12 goals.

Teams

Source:

Group stage

Group A

Group B

Knockout phase

Quarter-finals

|}

Semi-finals

|}

Finals

|}

Top goalscorers

Source:

See also
 Copa Paulista de Futebol
 Campeonato Paulista Série A2
 Campeonato Paulista Série A3
 Campeonato Paulista Segunda Divisão

References

Campeonato Paulista seasons
Paulista